is a sort of .  Translated to English, it would be termed "buckwheat mush" or "buckwheat spoonbread". It is a national Slovene dish. Balthasar Hacquet (1739–1815) mentions that  was served with sauerkraut in Upper Carniola. The oldest preparation method explains the word . The word  is derived from the Slovenian verb  meaning "to burn" or "to toast".  are served together with obaras, meat sauces, sauerkraut, Black pudding, various sausages. The ingredients may vary through different regions.

In general the main ingredients are:
 buckwheat flour
 water
 salt
 cracklings
 oil or grease

and in some cases potatoes are mixed in.

See also
 List of buckwheat dishes

References

Slovenian cuisine
Buckwheat dishes

de:Sterz#Heidensterz